Adam Orris House is a historic home located at Mechanicsburg in Cumberland County, Pennsylvania. It was built about 1887, and is a three-story, rectangular brick building in the Second Empire style.  It features a tin mansard roof, projecting three-story bay, corner tower, and full-width front porch. Also on the property is a contributing carriage house, also built about 1887.

It was listed on the National Register of Historic Places in 1987.

References 

Houses on the National Register of Historic Places in Pennsylvania
Second Empire architecture in Pennsylvania
Houses completed in 1887
Houses in Cumberland County, Pennsylvania
National Register of Historic Places in Cumberland County, Pennsylvania